George Mumford (died December 31, 1818) was a Congressional Representative from North Carolina.

Mumford was born in Rowan County, North Carolina, birth date unknown. He attended the common schools. He was a member of the State house of commons in 1810 and 1811. He was elected as a Democratic-Republican to the Fifteenth Congress (March 4, 1817 – December 31, 1818)

Mumford died in Washington, D.C., was is buried in the Congressional Cemetery.

See also 
 List of United States Congress members who died in office (1790–1899)

References 
 U.S. Congress Biographical Directory entry

Members of the North Carolina House of Representatives
Burials at the Congressional Cemetery
1818 deaths
18th-century births
Year of birth unknown
Democratic-Republican Party members of the United States House of Representatives from North Carolina